Lernaeidae is a family of copepods belonging to the order Cyclopoida.

Genera

Genera:
 Afrolernaea Fryer, 1956
 Amazolernaea Thatcher & Williams, 1998
 Areotrachelus Wilson, 1924
 Bedsylernaea Thatcher & Williams, 1998
 Catlaphila Tripathi, 1960
 Catlaphilla Tripathi, 1960
 Dysphorus Kurtz, 1924
 Hepatophylus Quidor, 1912
 Indolernaea Kabata, 1983
 Indopeniculus Kumari, Khera & Gupta, 1988
 Lamproglena Nordmann, 1832
 Lamproglenoides Fryer, 1964
 Lernaea Linnaeus, 1758
 Lernaeenicinae Wilson, 1917
 Lernaeinae Wilson, 1917
 Lernaeogiraffa Zimmermann, 1923
 Minilernaea Thatcher & Huergo, 2005
 Opistholernaea Yin, 1960
 Pillainus Kabata, 1983
 Pseudolamproglena Boxshall, 1976
 Taurocheros Brian, 1924

References

Copepods